Matthew Raymond-Barker (born 20 June 1989 in London, England) is an English singer who won the second season of the French X Factor in 2011. He received the grand cash prize and a recording deal with Sony Music.

Early life

Born in London, Matthew William Raymond-Barker is the only son of Karen (née Jacobs) and William Francis Raymond-Barker.  He lives in Mitcham, south-west London, works in Waterford and attended Emanuel School in Battersea.

Raymond-Barker had applied initially to the British The X Factor competition, but was rejected after the first day of bootcamp.

Raymond-Barker is a student, studying French and Spanish at the University of Bath and was in France for a period of six months to improve his French language skills at University of Toulouse. He applied to the French X Factor in Montpellier after a friend of his spotted an advertisement for the French competition.

He was coached in the series by Véronic DiCaire.

Performances on X Factor
Raymond-Barker qualified to the Final 12 after singing "Just the Way You Are" by Bruno Mars in the auditions. During the live shows, he sang the following songs:

During the competition, he was in Bottom two only once (week 8–7 June 2011) and sang for his life against Florian Giustiniani and was saved by unanimous vote of the judges after singing "Use Somebody" from the Kings of Leon.

In the finals, aired on 28 June, he beat Marina D'Amico who became runner-up. The difference between the two was a mere 1300 votes. Maryvette Lair finished third.

Post X Factor
Raymond-Barker's winner's song, a cover of Daniel Balavoine's hit "Vivre ou survivre", was his debut single in France, and was released on 2 July 2011. The single debuted at number 94. His first album was due for release in November 2011 on Sony Music and reportedly titled Trash, but never materialised. The single from the prospective album, was an electro-pop track called "Trash (Tout le monde jump sur le bar)". It was released 19 September 2011 but did not chart. In 2012 he released his debut album "One" which has never reached the French Top 250 selling fewer than 50 copies in its first week. A few months later only 500 copies have been sold. "One" is the lowest selling album from a winner of that kind of TV show in France.

Discography

Singles

References

External links
Official message board

1989 births
Living people
The X Factor winners
Singers from London
English expatriates in France
English male singers
21st-century English singers
21st-century British male singers